In the taxonomy of microorganisms, the Methanocella are a genus of the Euryarchaeota.

Phylogeny

See also
 List of Archaea genera

References

External links
Type strain of Methanocella arvoryzae at BacDive -  the Bacterial Diversity Metadatabase
Type strain of Methanocella conradii at BacDive -  the Bacterial Diversity Metadatabase

Archaea genera